Monette is a city in Craighead County, Arkansas, United States. The population was 1,506 at the 2020 census.

History

On December 10, 2021, a large and violent EF4 tornado part of a large tornado outbreak struck Monette. One person was killed at a nursing home on the north side of town.

Geography
Monette is located in eastern Craighead County at  (35.890969, -90.344247).

Ecologically, Monette is located within the St. Francis Lowlands ecoregion within the larger Mississippi Alluvial Plain. The St. Francis Lowlands are a flat region mostly covered with row crop agriculture today, though also containing sand blows and sunken lands remaining from the 1811–12 New Madrid earthquakes. Waterways have mostly been channelized, causing loss of aquatic and riparian wildlife habitat. The St. Francis Sunken Lands Wildlife Management Area, which preserves some of the bottomland hardwood forest typical of this ecoregion prior to development for row agriculture lies just west of Monette along the St. Francis River.

List of highways 
 Highway 18
 Highway 139

Demographics

Monette is included in the Jonesboro, Arkansas Metropolitan Statistical Area.

2020 census

As of the 2020 United States census, there were 1,506 people, 730 households, and 449 families residing in the city.

2009
As of the census of 2009, there were 1,247 people, 529 households, and 321 families residing in the city. The racial makeup of the city was 96.61% White, 0.08% Black or African American, 0.08% Native American, 1.44% from other races, and 1.78% from two or more races.  2.63% of the population were Hispanic or Latino of any race.

There were 525 households, out of which 23.8% had children under the age of 18 living with them, 47.2% were married couples living together, 10.7% had a female householder with no husband present, and 39.6% were non-families. 37.9% of all households were made up of individuals, and 24.4% had someone living alone who was 65 years of age or older.  The average household size was 2.12 and the average family size was 2.78.

In the city, the population was spread out, with 19.7% under the age of 18, 7.3% from 18 to 24, 23.6% from 25 to 44, 23.7% from 45 to 64, and 25.8% who were 65 years of age or older.  The median age was 44 years. For every 100 females, there were 76.5 males.  For every 100 females age 18 and over, there were 73.4 males.

The median income for a household in the city was $27,500, and the median income for a family was $33,796. Males had a median income of $28,375 versus $20,109 for females. The per capita income for the city was $16,517.  About 13.3% of families and 16.4% of the population were below the poverty line, including 20.8% of those under age 18 and 25.7% of those age 65 or over.

Education

Public education 
Monette is the headquarters for the Buffalo Island Central School District, which provides public education to more than 850 elementary and secondary school students in Craighead and Mississippi counties. Students graduate from the Monette-based Buffalo Island Central High School. The school's mascot and athletic emblem is the Mustangs.

The Buffalo Island Central School District was established on July 1, 1984. Until that point the Monette School District served the community; on that day it merged with the Leachville School District to form the current school district.

Public libraries 
Kohn Memorial Library is the city's public library and one of seven branch libraries of the Crowley Ridge Regional library system.

Notable person
 Dave Wallace, Republican member of the Arkansas House of Representatives from Mississippi County; former Monette resident

References

External links

Cities in Arkansas
Cities in Craighead County, Arkansas
Jonesboro metropolitan area